Hotel GB is a British reality television series broadcast on Channel 4 airing for five consecutive nights in October 2012. Presented by Paddy McGuinness live from Hotel GB, the show's stars (all of whom feature in Channel 4 shows) take on a one-week challenge, helping unemployed young people find work. It was axed on 1 April 2013 due to poor ratings.

The team

Ratings
Episode viewing figures from BARB.

References

External links
 
 

2010s British reality television series
2012 British television series debuts
2012 British television series endings
Channel 4 original programming
Television series by All3Media
Television series by Optomen